Andrea Češková (born 18 October 1971) is a Czech Civic Democratic Party politician. She was a Member of the European Parliament for the Czech Republic between 2009 and 2014.

After graduating in law from Charles University in Prague, Češková served as a councillor in Prague from 1998 to 2009, when she took up her seat in the European Parliament.

Footnotes

1971 births
Living people
Politicians from Prague
Women MEPs for the Czech Republic
Civic Democratic Party (Czech Republic) MEPs
MEPs for the Czech Republic 2009–2014
Charles University alumni
University of West Bohemia alumni